The Missouri General Assembly is the state legislature of the U.S. state of Missouri. The bicameral General Assembly is composed of a 34-member Senate and a 163-member House of Representatives. Members of both houses of the General Assembly are subject to term limits. Senators are limited to two four-year terms and representatives to four two-year terms, a total of 8 years for members of both houses.

The General Assembly meets at the Missouri State Capitol in Jefferson City.

Qualifications
Members of the House of Representatives must be 24 years of age to be elected. Representatives also must be a qualified Missouri voter for two years, and a resident of the county or district of their constituency for one year. Senators must be 30 years of age, a qualified Missouri voter for three years, and similar to House qualifications, must be a resident of their senatorial constituency for one year prior to their election.

Sessions and quorum
According to Article III, Section 20 of the Missouri Constitution, the General Assembly must convene on the first Wednesday after the first Monday in January following the state general election. It adjourns on May 30, with no consideration of bills after 6:00 p.m. on the first Friday following the second Monday in May. No appropriation bill may be considered after 6:00 p.m. on the first Friday after the first Monday in May. If the Governor returns a bill with his objections after adjournment sine die, the General Assembly is automatically reconvened on the first Wednesday following the second Monday in September for a period not to exceed ten days to consider vetoed bills.

The Governor may convene the General Assembly in special session for a maximum of 60 calendar days at any time. Only subjects recommended by the Governor in his call or a special message may be considered. The President Pro Tem and the Speaker may convene a 30-day special session upon petition of three-fourths of the members of each chamber.

Neither the House nor Senate, without the consent of the other chamber, adjourn for more than ten days at any one time, nor to any other place than that in which the two houses may be sitting.

As a part-time legislature, compensation is low with the General Assembly, and most senators and representatives hold jobs outside their legislative duties. Lawmakers are paid $36,8131 per legislative year.

See also
Missouri State Capitol
Missouri House of Representatives
Missouri Senate
Missouri Constitutional Convention of 1861–1863

References

External links
Official General Assembly Website
Missouri Senate Website
Missouri House of Representatives Website
Publications by or about Missouri General Assembly at Internet Archive.

 
Bicameral legislatures